USS LST-849 was an  in the United States Navy during World War II. Late in her U.S. Navy career, she was renamed Johnson County (LST-849)—after counties in Arkansas, Georgia, Illinois, Indiana, Iowa, Kansas, Kentucky, Missouri, Nebraska, Tennessee, Texas, and Wyoming—but never saw active service under that name.

LST-849 was laid down on 10 November 1944 at Ambridge, Pennsylvania, by the American Bridge Co.; launched on 30 December 1944; sponsored by Mrs. William B. Hetzel; and commissioned on 16 January 1945.

During World War II, LST-849 was assigned to the Asiatic-Pacific theater and participated in the assault and occupation of Okinawa Gunto in May and June 1945. Following the war, LST-849 performed occupation duty in the Far East until mid-September 1945. She returned to the United States and was decommissioned on 13 June 1946 and assigned to the Pacific Reserve Fleet. While berthed in the Columbia River with the Pacific Reserve Fleet, she was named Johnson County 1 July 1955, after counties in 12 states.

Under provisions of the Military Assistance Program, she was transferred to the Republic of Korea January 1959, and served the ROK navy as Wi Bong (LST-812).

LST-849 earned one battle star for World War II service.

ROKS Wi Bong 

The ship was transferred to the Republic of Korea on 22 December 1958, and renamed ROKS Wi Bong (LST-812).
She was later redesignated LST-676.

The ship participated in 16 combat missions in Vietnam.

On 31 December 2006 LST-676 was retired from active service in the Korean Navy.

On 25 December 2007 Gunsan city signed a contract with the Korean Navy to move the ship to Jinpo Maritime Park to serve as an educational landmark.

References

External links 
 
 globalsecurity.org: LST 671 Un Bong LST

 

LST-542-class tank landing ships
Ships built in Ambridge, Pennsylvania
1944 ships
World War II amphibious warfare vessels of the United States
Ships transferred from the United States Navy to the Republic of Korea Navy
Johnson County, Arkansas
Johnson County, Georgia
Johnson County, Illinois
Johnson County, Indiana
Johnson County, Iowa
Johnson County, Kansas
Johnson County, Kentucky
Johnson County, Missouri
Johnson County, Nebraska
Johnson County, Tennessee
Johnson County, Texas
Johnson County, Wyoming
Museum ships in South Korea